Milt Jackson and the Hip String Quartet is an album by vibraphonist Milt Jackson accompanied by a string quartet arranged and conducted by Tom McIntosh that was recorded in 1968 and released on the Verve label.

Reception
The Allmusic review awarded the album three out of five stars.

Track listing
 "You Got to Pay When the Deal Goes Down" (Tom McIntosh) - 3:28 
 "The Morning After" (Bernard Ebbinghouse) - 3:30 
 "For All We Know" (J. Fred Coots, Sam M. Lewis) - 3:29 
 "A Walkin' Thing" (Benny Carter) - 5:33 
 "In Walked Bud" (Thelonious Monk) - 3:37 
 "A Little Too Much" (Mike Appel, Don Henny) - 3:46 
 "Bags and Strings" (Milt Jackson) - 3:30 
 "New Rhumba" (Ahmad Jamal) - 4:13 
Recorded on May 9, 1968 (track eight), June 3, 1968 (tracks four and seven) and June 17, 1968 (tracks one to three, five and six)

Personnel
Milt Jackson – vibes
Hubert Laws - flute (tracks 4, 7 & 8) 
James Moody - tenor saxophone, flute (tracks 1-3, 5 & 6)
Sanford Allen - violin 
Alfred Brown - viola 
Sidney Edwards (tracks 1-3, 5 & 6), Ronald Lipscomb, Kermit Moore (tracks 4, 7 & 8) - cello 
Cedar Walton - piano
Ron Carter (tracks 4, 7 & 8), Bob Cranshaw (tracks 1-3, 5 & 6) - bass 
Mickey Roker (tracks 1-3, 5, 6 & 8), Grady Tate (tracks 4 & 7) - drums
Tom McIntosh - arranger, conductor

References 

Verve Records albums
Milt Jackson albums
Albums arranged by Tom McIntosh
1968 albums